Arumuganeri railway station is a station in Arumuganeri, Thoothukudi district, in the state of Tamil Nadu, India. It belongs to the Madurai railway division.

History 
The station lies on the Tiruchendur-Thoothukudi state highway. There are many salt fields in the surrounding areas . The main reason for building this station was for freight transport. The salt manufactured were processed in mills, then packed and finally transported. But now salt transportation through goods train has stopped.

Services 
Chendur Express is the only direct train from this station to Chennai. There are passenger trains to Tirunelveli, Thoothukudi, Palani & Tiruchendur from Arumuganeri.

References

External links 
 

Madurai railway division
Railway stations in Thoothukudi district
Railway stations opened in 1942